{{Infobox college basketball team
|name = Washburn Ichabods men's basketball
|current =
|logo = Washburn Ichabods logo.svg
|logo_size = 200
|university = Washburn University
|conference = The MIAA
|firstseason = 1905–06
|record = 1,622–1,097–2
|location = Topeka, Kansas
|coach = Brett Ballard
|tenure = 5th
|arena = Lee Arena
|capacity = 4,150
|nickname = Ichabods
|h_pattern_b = _thinsidesonwhite
|h_body = 003a70
|h_shorts = FFFFFF
|h_pattern_s = _navysides
|a_pattern_b = _thinwhitesides
|a_body = 003a70
|a_shorts = 003a70
|a_pattern_s = _whitesides
|NCAAchampion = National Association of Intercollegiate Athletics1987
|NCAAfinalfour = National Association of Intercollegiate Athletics1987

National Collegiate Athletic Association1994, 2001|NCAAeliteeight = National Association of Intercollegiate Athletics1987

National Collegiate Athletic Association1993, 1994, 2001|NCAAsweetsixteen = National Association of Intercollegiate Athletics1987

National Collegiate Athletic Association1993, 1994, 2001|NCAAroundof32 = National Association of Intercollegiate Athletics1987

National Collegiate Athletic Association1992, 1993, 1994, 1997, 2000, 2001, 2003, 2004, 2011, 2012|NCAAopeninground = National Association of Intercollegiate Athletics1987

National Collegiate Athletic Association1992, 1993, 1994, 1995, 1997, 2000, 2001, 2003, 2004, 2005, 2011, 2012''
|conference_tournament = Central States Intercollegiate Conference1982, 1983, 1984Mid-America Intercollegiate Athletics Association2005, 2007, 2009, 2013, 2021
|conference_season = Kansas Conference1909, 1924, 1925Central Intercollegiate Athletic Conference1928, 1950, 1951, 1966, 1967Great Plains Athletic Conference1973Central States Intercollegiate Conference1978, 1986, 1987Mid-America Intercollegiate Athletics Association1991, 1992, 1993, 1994, 1996, 2000, 2002, 2003, 2004, 2011
}}

The Washburn Ichabods men's basketball team represents Washburn University in Topeka, Kansas, in the NCAA Division II men's basketball competition. The team is currently coached by Brett Ballard, who is in his first year at the helm. Ballard replaced Bob Chipman, who retired after the 2016–17 season. The Ichabods currently compete in the Mid-America Intercollegiate Athletics Association (MIAA). The basketball team plays its home games in Lee Arena on campus.

 Overview 
Washburn annually plays a thirty-game conference schedule that is preceded by an out-of-conference schedule that includes three exhibition games. The conference schedule consists of playing every MIAA member at least once, some twice.

History
Washburn's basketball program began in with the 1905–06 season, forty years after the university was founded. Overall, the team has won 21 conference championships and one national title.

The beginning: 1905–1921
Beginning with the 1905–06 season, the program's first, Harry C. Byrd was chosen to lead the program. In his first four seasons as head coach, Byrd led the Ichabods to winning records and a total of 31–20. In 1909–10 season, Byrd led the Ichabods their first conference championship. In Byrd's 16 years as head coach, he led the team to nine winning seasons and seven losing seasons, compiling a record of 116–112–1.

 

A new era: two new conferences (1921–1946)
In 1921, Dwight Ream took over the program for one season. After Ream left with an 8–9 record, Mike Vosburg took over for the 1922–23 season. Vosburg left with a 7–11 record. After two years with two different coaches, McPherson College coach, Dutch Lonborg, became head coach. From 1923 to 1927, Lonborg led the Ichabods to a 61–14–1 record, producing the second, and last, of the team's two ties as well as winning two conference regular season championships. Lonborg is a Naismith Memorial Basketball Hall of Fame.

When Lonborg left after the 1926–27 season, Washburn entered a new era: Roy Wynne was named head coach, and the school joined the newly created Central Intercollegiate Athletic Conference. During Wynne's three seasons as head coach, he produced a 29–22 record. Following Wynne's departure, McPherson's football coach, George Gardner, took over. Coaching for three seasons and a total record of 19–28, Gardner was fired and was replaced by Elmer Holm. Holm's first season was a losing season and the last year in the CIAC. In 1934, Washburn moved joined the Missouri Valley Conference. Holm led the team for two more seasons, ending with a record of 21–36. In 1936, Dee Errikson took over team, leading for the next ten seasons and through World War II. Errikson led the team to an overall record of 67–122, making him one of the most unsuccessful coaches in Washburn history.

|- style="background: #012757"
| colspan="6" style="text-align:center;"| |- style="background: #012757; color: white"
| colspan="6" style="text-align:center;"| No Conference – World War II

Post-World War II: 1946–1979
For the next thirty years after World War II, the Washburn saw five coaches come and go, with the addition of an interim for three games. In 1946, Washburn rejoined the Central Intercollegiate Athletic Conference after competing in the Missouri Valley for nine seasons and no conference for three during the war. After the war, Washburn hired Topeka High School basketball coach Adrian Miller, for would coach for five seasons. Before Miller took the helm of the team, Washburn went nearly 20 years without a winning season and although Miller went 8–11 overall in his first season, Miller quickly turned the team around in 1947–48 going 15–9. For the next three seasons, Miller led the Ichabods to 10 wins or more. After the 1950–51 season, Miller resigned with a 64–46 record to become an insurance agent.

After Miller resigned, Washburn hired former assistant Marion McDonald, who previously served as assistant coach for Fort Hays Kansas State College.

In 1960, Norm Short took over for the Ichabods for the next six seasons. During his six-season, Short led the team to a 46–74 record, with only one winning season. After leading the Ichabods to a 5–20, 2–6 conference record in 1965–66, Short resigned. Short coached at Central Missouri State from 1966 to 1972.

|- style="background: #012757"
| colspan="6" style="text-align:center;"| |- style="background: #012757"
| colspan="6" style="text-align:center;"| Great Plains Athletic Conference|- style="background: #012757"
| colspan="6" style="text-align:center;"| Bob Chipman era: 1979–present
In 1979, Washburn assistant head coach Bob Chipman took over the program. During his first five years as head coach, Chipman led the Ichabods to a 105–46 overall record, winning the MIAA Tournament Championship in 1982–84. Two seasons later, Chipman led the Ichabods to Washburn's first – as well as his first – NAIA basketball championship. The following season, the Ichabods won the conference regular season championship.

In 1989, the Ichabods made the move from the NAIA to the NCAA Division II, which also meant they would join a new conference: the Missouri Intercollegiate Athletic Association. Since joining the MIAA, Chipman had led his teams to nine conference regular season championships, four conference championships, 11 NCAA Tournament appearances, and a national runners-up in 2001. Chipman retired at the end of the 2016–17 season.

|- style="background: #D21241; color:white"
| colspan="6" style="text-align:center;"| Mid-America Intercollegiate Athletics Association'''

References

External links